Leiser is a surname. Notable people with the surname include:

Alfred Leiser (born 1929), Swiss racewalker
Brian Leiser (better known as Fast, born 1972), American musician
Clara Leiser (c. 1898–1991), American writer, journalist, and activist
David Leiser (born 1952), Israeli professor of psychology
Eric Leiser, American filmmaker, animator and holographer
Ernest Leiser (1921–2002), American executive producer and journalist
Erwin Leiser (1923–1996), German Jew, director, writer and actor
Jacques Leiser, American artists manager and photographer
Louis G. Leiser (1927–2009), American major general in the United States Air Force
Martin Leiser (born 1978), Swiss athlete
Vreni Leiser (born  1945), Swiss sprinter
Walter Leiser (born 1931), Swiss rower

See also 
Leiser Madanes (born 1950), Argentine writer, philosopher and professor
Moshe Leiser and Patrice Caurier, Opera directors